In Hindu epics, Gajasura (lit. "elephant demon") is a generic name given to an asura (demon), who assumes the form of an elephant. It may refer to demons:
 killed by god Shiva: see Gajasurasamhara
 killed by Shiva and his head attached his elephant-headed son and god of wisdom Ganesha: see Mythological_anecdotes_of_Ganesha#Shiva_and_Gajasura
 Gajmukhasur defeated, turned into a rat and made vahana (vehicle) by Ganesha
 killed by Rudras

Asura
Elephants in Indian culture
Elephants in Hinduism